The North Melbourne Grand Final Breakfast is a breakfast function organised by the North Melbourne Football Club on the morning of the AFL Grand Final. The breakfast marks the traditional beginning to Grand Final day and is one of the biggest social highlights on the Australian sporting calendar. Watching the event is a ritual for many footy fans and the function plays a huge role in the pre match build up for the Grand Final.

History
The first Grand Final Breakfast was held in 1967 at the Southern Cross hotel, as a valuable fundraising event. The inaugural guest speaker was the VFL's Administrative director Eric McCutchan. The event rose to prominence in the 1970s when the breakfast began to be televised across Victoria, and was officially endorsed by the VFL as the official pre-match Grand Final function. Since then the event has grown into a significant money raiser for North Melbourne, and the guest list has grown to include Prime Ministers, State Premiers and other celebrities.

Event

Although many clubs hold their own Grand Final Breakfasts, the North Melbourne Breakfast was the first breakfast and is currently the only breakfast to be officially endorsed by the AFL. This ensures a guest list that reads as a 'who's who' of Australian business, sport, entertainment and politics. The breakfast includes a Grand Auction, with all proceeds being donated to the Starlight Children's Foundation.

Quotes

Former Prime Minister Bob Hawke described the event as
“one of this nation’s great traditions”.

Paul Keating referred to the function as
“a tradition in itself”

Prime Minister John Howard described it as
“a tremendous institution …. and the most eclectic gathering of people you could possibly imagine”.

Venues

See also

 Champagne breakfast
 Index of breakfast-related articles
 List of dining events
 NRL Grand Final Breakfast

References

External links

Australian Football League
North Melbourne Football Club
Australian sports television series
Breakfast
VFL/AFL Grand Finals
Dining events
Spring (season) events in Australia
1967 establishments in Australia
Recurring events established in 1967